The Vatican City national football team is the football team that represents Vatican City under the control of the Vatican Amateur Sports Association, headquartered in the Vatican's Cortile di San Damaso. The Vatican City football association was founded in 1972. Its current president is Domenico Ruggerio. Gianfranco Guadagnoli, an Italian, is the current head coach. 

The team played its first match in 1985, a 3–0 victory against a representative of Austrian journalists. In 2018, the Vatican also created a women's representative team.

Overview

In the year 2000, Pope John Paul II established a Vatican sports department with the aim of "reinvigorating the tradition (of sport) within the Christian community". In 2006, Vatican Secretary of State Cardinal Tarcisio Bertone suggested that the Vatican could field a team of men from Catholic seminaries. About the prospect, the cardinal stated, "If we just take the Brazilian students from our Pontifical universities we could have a magnificent squad." The cardinal also noted that in the 1990 FIFA World Cup, there were 42 players in the final round who attended Salesian training centres worldwide. For example, Marcelino, Spanish hero of the 1964 European Nations' Cup, was a former seminarian.  It was Bertone's proposal that the Vatican's players, even if accepted by UEFA, would be drawn from the population within the Catholic Church worldwide, not just citizens of Vatican City. He was unclear at the time whether the Vatican would grant these players Vatican citizenship to make this possible.

With the smallest population of any nation, approximately 900, it is difficult to form a squad. The Vatican City squad consists entirely of employees of the Vatican: police officers, postal workers, government officials and members of the Pontifical Swiss Guard, the Vatican's de facto army, charged with protecting the pope. Since most Vatican citizens are members of the Swiss Guard, they cannot be amassed in large numbers for a long time. Therefore, the national team has played only a few rare international matches, often drawing a fair amount of interested press. When Vatican City played its first match in 2002, only one player, Marcello Rosati, had a Vatican passport. In 2010, Vatican City was invited to participate in the Viva World Cup by the N.F.-Board and were expected to participate but were unable to do so because they could not assemble a 15-man roster. In total, Vatican City have played only four full international matches against other nations, one draw and three defeats to Monaco in 2002, 2011, 2013, and 2014 respectively.

In addition to its full international matches, the team has played a friendly match, its first, against the San Marino reserve team in 1994. The final score of that match is believed to be a 0–0 draw but Steve Menary's book 'Outcasts: The Lands that FIFA Forgot' states that Vatican insiders told him that the match ended 1–1. In 2010, the Vatican organized a team to play a friendly game against Palestine. However, the team was made up of Catholic priests and was not considered the Vatican City national team. In 2006, the Vatican City played SV Vollmond, a team from Switzerland, at Stadio Petriana with Vatican City prevailing 5–1. The team has also competed against a representative team from the Diocese of Limburg. In September 2016 the team participated in a triangular tournament at the Manlio Scopigno Stadium in Rieti to raise funds for earthquake victims. Former Italian international Simone Perrotta also participated in the tournament.

In April 2019 it was announced that the team had signed its first-ever sponsor, Poderi di San Pietro, a family-owned winery in Milan. The agreement was reached after ensuring that the organization met the strict ethical criteria established by the team. Previously, the Association was approached by a sports betting organization offering a very large sponsorship but was rejected for not aligning with those ethical standards.

The Vatican's stance on football
Vatican footballing history began on 7 January 1521 when the first match of Calcio Fiorentino was played in the Vatican in the Cortile del Belvedere, in the presence of Pope Leo X. The first Vatican league was created in 1973 and was first won by employees of L'Osservatore Romano, the newspaper of the Holy See.

The Vatican has typically expressed strong support for football. Pope John Paul II was reportedly a goalkeeper in his youth in Poland, and an ardent supporter of Cracovia Kraków. Late German pope Pope Benedict XVI was an ardent supporter of Bayern Munich since his youth growing up in Bavaria, Germany. Benedict is quoted as saying, "The sport of football can be a vehicle of education for the values of honesty, solidarity and fraternity, especially for the younger generation." In October 2007, the Pope was presented with a #16 shirt (in reference to the sixteenth use of his papal name) by Serie B side Ancona after Benedict supported their initiative to become a "beacon of morality" by adopting an "innovative, ethical model of practising football".

In 2010, Benedict and the Vatican reaffirmed their belief that football should be a beacon of morality by lashing out at Serie A after matches for the upcoming season were scheduled at 12:30pm on Sundays to appease pay-per-view companies wishing to spread out Serie A matches over the weekend.  The Vatican previously questioned the league's decision to play matches on Sundays at all, but "I consider this a truly harmful development," Monsignor Carlo Mazza told Tuttosport. "Putting people in front of the television screen at 12.30 CET, when they are having lunch with their families, to me seems like a 'pitch invasion' on life." Additionally, on 18 December 2006, Tarcisio Bertone, Cardinal Secretary of State of the Holy See, stated, but only in jest, that he did not preclude the possibility that the Vatican, in the future, could put together a football team of great value, that could play on the same level as, Roma, Internazionale and Milan or Genoa. The current Argentinian pope, Pope Francis is an ardent fan of his hometown club San Lorenzo, and exhibited disappointment when Argentina lost the 2014 World Cup final against Germany.

FIFA membership
Vatican City is one of only nine fully recognized sovereign states the national teams of which are not FIFA members. The others are the Federated States of Micronesia, Kiribati, the Marshall Islands, Monaco, Nauru, Palau, Tuvalu, and the United Kingdom (though the UK's four "home nations"—England, Scotland, Wales and Northern Ireland—have individual FIFA teams each of which is also a member of the IFAB).

In 2006, UEFA spokesperson William Gaillard told a media outlet that he saw no reason why Vatican City should not have a national team in international competitions. He said, "We already have states of 30,000 citizens like San Marino, Liechtenstein, and Andorra. If the Vatican wants to become a member of UEFA all it has to do is apply. If it meets the requirements, it will be accepted". At that time Cardinal Tarcisio Bertone insisted that the Vatican's football future lies only in amateur games and competitions.

In May 2014, Domenico Ruggerio, president of the national football association, reinforced Bertone's words from eight years prior, stating that "I prefer to be amateur...To join FIFA, at that level, will be like a business" after stating "The important message of friendship and love is demonstrated by the sport — the real sport, not the business that is in football these days...It is not just important to win a match; it is how you carry yourself." Therefore, that, he added, meant that "the ethos of the Vatican’s soccer team was, at odds with FIFA membership."

In an April 2019 interview Danilo Zennaro, football director of Vatican City, told the St. Galler Tagblatt that the association would also not seek membership in an alternate confederation like ConIFA because of "political reasons" such as the diplomatic strife that would ensue from being in the same organization as breakaway regions and disputed territories.

In May 2022, the association celebrated the conclusion of its fiftieth anniversary. Despite a history of contrary comments, among the topics discussed was the possibility of the association joining UEFA. It was revealed that Pope Francis spoke with UEFA President Aleksander Čeferin about the possibility when the latter visited the Pope ahead of the UEFA Euro 2020 final.

Kit
In the past, the kit has been provided by Diadora. The shorts were all white while the top is solid yellow with a narrow blue and white line around the right upper quadrant of the body. The team's kit was then provided by Sportika SA until July 2021. The kit had an image of Saint Peter's Basilica ghosted on the front. 

In July 2021 the association introduced a new kit by Joma. For the first time, the kits became readily available to the public as they were sold in the gift shop of the Vatican Museums with the profits benefitting Pope Francis's works of charity. The kit included a badge on the arm commemorating the fiftieth anniversary of the Vatican football association.

Matches

Final results
Up to matches played on 21 November 2021.

Source(s): Sport in Vaticano, Sport in Vaticano, RSSSF, ELO

Coaches
The team has been managed by Giovanni Trapattoni in the past. His first match as manager was played on 23 October 2010 when Vatican City faced a team composed of Italian financial police.

 Saverio Di Pofi
 Giovanni Trapattoni
 Gianfranco Guadagnoli
 Massimiliano Strappetti

See also
 Sport in Vatican City
 Campionato della Città del Vaticano
 List of football clubs in Vatican City
 Index of Vatican City-related articles

Notes

External links
 Vatican City men's national football team international games at RSSSF 
 Official website
  
 CSI – Centro Sportivo Italiano 
 Clericus Cup 

 
European national and official selection-teams not affiliated to FIFA